Acanthophila magnimaculata is a moth in the family Gelechiidae. It is found in Russia, where it is known only from the southern part of Primorsky Krai.

The wingspan is 11–12 mm. The forewings are dark grey with a light grey costal stroke at three-fourths of the wing length and four indistinct blackish spots. The hindwings are dark grey.

References

magnimaculata
Moths described in 2003
Moths of Asia